was a Japanese swimmer who competed in the 1964 Summer Olympics.

References

1943 births
2006 deaths
Japanese male backstroke swimmers
Olympic swimmers of Japan
Swimmers at the 1964 Summer Olympics
Asian Games medalists in swimming
Swimmers at the 1962 Asian Games
Asian Games gold medalists for Japan
Asian Games silver medalists for Japan
Medalists at the 1962 Asian Games
20th-century Japanese people